Rhachiosteus is an extinct monospecific genus of arthrodire placoderm from the Middle to Late Devonian of Germany.  It is known only from a single specimen, which may be a larval or juvenile form, as the skull of said specimen is only 19 millimetres long.

Phylogeny
Rhachiosteus is a basal member of the clade Pachyosteomorphi, the sister taxon to Coccosteomorphi, which together are the two main sub-clades of Eubrachythoraci. The cladogram below shows the phylogeny of Rhachiosteus:

References

Arthrodires
Placoderms of Europe
Arthrodire genera